John Serle (fl. 1414–1449) of Plympton, Devon, was an English Member of Parliament for Plympton Erle in November 1414, 1431, 1432, 1433, 1435, 1437, 1442 and February 1449.

References

14th-century births
1449 deaths
English MPs November 1414
English MPs 1431
English MPs 1432
English MPs 1433
English MPs 1435
English MPs 1437
English MPs 1442
English MPs February 1449
Members of the Parliament of England for Plympton Erle